Alexander Mosby Clayton (January 15, 1801 – September 30, 1889) was an American politician who served as a Deputy from Mississippi to the Provisional Congress of the Confederate States from February to May 1861.

Biography
Clayton was born in Campbell County, Virginia. He migrated first to Arkansas, where he served on the Territorial Supreme Court in 1832, then to Mississippi where he served as a state court judge from 1842 to 1852. From 1844 to 1852, he served as the first president of the University of Mississippi Board of Trustees. In 1853 he served as United States consul in Havana, Cuba. He represented the state in the Provisional C.S. Congress from February to May, 1861. He resigned and was appointed as a Confederate District Court Judge for the balance of the year. After the war he again served as a state court judge from 1866 to 1869.

References

External links

Alexander Mosby Clayton at The Political Graveyard

1801 births
1889 deaths
19th-century American politicians
19th-century American judges
Burials in Mississippi
Judges of the Confederate States of America
Members of the Confederate House of Representatives from Mississippi
Mississippi state court judges
People from Campbell County, Virginia
People of Mississippi in the American Civil War
Signers of the Confederate States Constitution
Signers of the Provisional Constitution of the Confederate States